Phil Douglas may refer to:

 Phil Douglas (baseball) (1890–1952), American baseball player
 Phil Douglas (musician), American musician and producer